Eutropis caraga, the Caraga sun skink, is a species of skink found in the Philippines.

References

Eutropis
Reptiles of the Philippines
Endemic fauna of the Philippines
Reptiles described in 2020
Taxa named by Rafe M. Brown
Taxa named by Arvin Cantor Diesmos
Taxa named by Cameron D. Siler